(1905–2004) was a Japanese film actor.

Filmography 
Shōgo Shimada appeared in 49 films from 1951 to 1995.

 Natsumatsuri Sandogasa (1951) - Shinzô
 Kunisada Chūji (1954) - Enzô
 Jigoku no kengô Hirate Miki (1954) - Shûsaku Chiba
 Kutsukake Tokijirō (1954) - Kutsukake Tokijirō
 Rokunin no Ansatsusha (1955)
 Osho ichidai (1955) - Irie
 Tôi hitotsu no michi (1960) - Takamori Saigo
 Satan's Sword (1960) - Shimada Toranosuke
 Zatoichi and the Chest of Gold (1964)
 Showa zankyo-den: Ippiki okami (1966)
 Japan's Longest Day (日本のいちばん長い日 Nihon no ichiban nagai hi) (1967) - Lt. General Takeshi Mori - CO 1st Imperial Guards Division
 Yûbue (1967) - Ginzô Tsutsui
 Jinsei-gekijô: Hishakaku to kiratsune (1968) 
 Aa, kaigun (1970) - Admiral Isoroku Yamamoto
 Ezo yakata no ketto (1970) - Jirozaemon Ezo
 Hana to namida to honoo (1970) - Seijuro Fujihana
 Tora! Tora! Tora! (1970) - Ambassador Kichisaburō Nomura
 Nihon Chinbotsu (Tidal Wave) (1973) - Watari (Political Fixer)
 Karafuto 1945 Summer Hyosetsu no Mon (1974)
 Mount Hakkoda (1977) - General Tomoda
 Blue Christmas (1978)
 Nogiku no Haka ("The Wild Daisy") (1981)
 The Challenge (1982) - Toru Yoshida's Father
 Kai (1985) - Daizo Moriyama
 Tokyo: The Last Megalopolis (1988) - Arata Mekata
 Tales of a Golden Geisha (1990) - Zenbu Okura
 The Setting Sun (Rakuyô) (1992)
 Tora-san's Matchmaker (1993) - Zenemon Tamiya
 Tenshu monogatari (1995) - Oumi-no-jou Touroku (final film role)

References

External links 

Japanese male film actors
1905 births
2004 deaths
Recipients of the Medal with Purple Ribbon
Recipients of the Order of the Rising Sun, 4th class